Neptis carlsbergi, the Carlsberg sailer, is a butterfly in the family Nymphalidae. It is found in Nigeria.

References

Butterflies described in 2005
carcassoni
Endemic fauna of Nigeria
Butterflies of Africa